The following is a list of some tunnels in the United States of America.  More tunnels may be found in each state than are included on this list.

Alabama
5th Avenue North Tunnel, Birmingham. Completed in 1909, this road tunnel runs beneath the former Birmingham Terminal Station site, now occupied by the Red Mountain Expressway.
John H. Bankhead Tunnel, a  road tunnel, US 98 under the Mobile River in Mobile.
Blount Tunnel, a rail tunnel near Blount Springs.
Brocks Gap Tunnel, a  CSX rail tunnel in Hoover near Birmingham, under Shades Mountain.
Cooks Springs Tunnel, a Norfolk Southern rail tunnel near Cooks Springs, on the main line between Birmingham and Anniston.
Coosa Tunnel a rail tunnel on an active Norfolk Southern line.  In Shelby County.
Hardwick Tunnel, a rail tunnel on the ATN Railway near Wattsville.
Hayden Tunnel, an active rail tunnel located near Hayden.
Jefferson Tunnel, abandoned rail tunnel in Jefferson County.
Laney Tunnel, an active rail tunnel on the ATN Railway near Glencoe.  Completed in 1851 and reinforced in 2010.
Oak Mountain Tunnel a rail tunnel on an active Norfolk Southern rail line. In Shelby County.
Palisade Tunnel, a  road tunnel on the Homewood side of Red Mountain.  The one-way tunnel provides west-bound access to Palisades Boulevard from Oxmoor Road.
Red Mountain Tunnel, a proposed road tunnel project that was meant to link Birmingham to its southern neighbors. The tunnel idea was abandoned and eventually the Red Mountain Expressway Cut was built instead.
Roper Tunnel, a rail tunnel on the ATN Railway near Trussville.
Tunnel Springs Tunnel, an  abandoned rail tunnel near Tunnel Springs.  The masonry tunnel was completed in 1899 and abandoned in 1994.
George C. Wallace Tunnel, twin road tunnels,  road tunnels, I-10 under the Mobile River in Mobile.
Waldo Tunnel, Former ACL tunnel on the CSX Lineville Sub.
Weathers Tunnel, a rail tunnel on the CSX near Weathers.

Alaska
Anton Anderson Memorial Tunnel, rail (Alaska Railroad) and highway (Portage Glacier Road), near Whittier

Arizona
Claypool Tunnel, abandoned highway tunnel next to US 60, just east of Superior
Poland Tunnel, abandoned pedestrian tunnel between the ghost towns of Poland and Walker, south of Prescott
Mule Pass Tunnel, SR 80, Bisbee, Arizona
Papago Freeway Tunnel/Deck Park Tunnel, twin tunnels, Interstate 10, Phoenix
Queen Creek Tunnel, US 60, just east of Superior
Verde Canyon Railroad Tunnel,  railway tunnel, Yavapai County

Arkansas
Bobby Hopper Tunnel, twin tunnels, Interstate 49, Washington County
Cotter Tunnel, rail tunnel under US 62, MNA Railroad, northwest of Cotter, Marion County
Crest Tunnel, rail tunnel under State Highway 14, MNA Railroad, northwest of Omaha, Boone County
Cricket Tunnel, rail tunnel under old U.S. Route 65, MNA Railroad, south of Omaha, Boone County
Pyatt Tunnel, rail tunnel under County Road 408, MNA Railroad, southeast of Pyatt, Marion County

California

Colorado
Alpine Tunnel, abandoned rail tunnel, Denver, South Park and Pacific Railroad, northeast of Pitkin, under the Continental Divide 
Beavertail Mountain Tunnel, twin tunnels, Interstate 70 and US 6 east of Palisade
Busk-Ivanhoe Tunnel, abandoned rail tunnel, Colorado Midland Railway, now part of an aqueduct, under the Continental Divide near Hagerman Pass
Eisenhower-Johnson Memorial Tunnel, twin tunnels, Interstate 70 under the Continental Divide near Loveland Pass northeast of Dillon
Hagerman Tunnel, abandoned rail tunnel, Colorado Midland Railway, under the Continental Divide near Hagerman Pass
Hanging Lake Tunnel, twin tunnels, Interstate 70 and US 6, Glenwood Canyon project, east of Glenwood Springs
Mesa Verde National Park Tunnel, main Park road between milesposts 4 and 5, 0.28 miles long
Moffat Tunnel, rail tunnel, Union Pacific Railroad (formerly Denver and Salt Lake Railway), under the Continental Divide near Rollins Pass  ; also a water tunnel
No Name Tunnel, twin tunnels, Interstate 70 and US 6, Glenwood Canyon project, east of Glenwood Springs
Reverse Curve Tunnel, westbound Interstate 70 and westbound US 6, Glenwood Canyon project, east of Glenwood Springs
Veterans Memorial Tunnels/Twin Tunnel, twin tunnels, Interstate 70 and US 6, east of Idaho Springs
Wolf Creek Pass Tunnel, US 160 between South Fork and Pagosa Springs

Connecticut
Heroes Tunnel, twin tunnels, Wilbur Cross Parkway/State Route 15, West Rock Ridge State Park, in New Haven
Pequabuck Tunnel, rail tunnel, originally Hartford, Providence and Fishkill Railroad, Plymouth
Pitkin Street Tunnel, road tunnel between Elm and State streets, downtown New Haven
Shepaug, Litchfield and Northern Railroad, abandoned  rail tunnel in Washington, now a rail trail
Taft Tunnel, rail tunnel, Providence and Worcester Railroad (originally part of Norwich and Worcester Railroad), in Lisbon (oldest active railroad tunnel in the United States)

District of Columbia

9th Street Tunnel, under the National Mall (one-way southbound from Constitution Avenue NW to I-395), NW to SW DC
12th Street Tunnel, under the National Mall (one-way northbound from I-395 and Independence Avenue SW to Constitution Avenue NW), SW to NW DC
16th Street NW tunnel, twin tunnels, under Scott Circle NW, NW DC
Barney Circle tunnel, twin tunnels, Southeast Boulevard SE under Barney Circle SE.  Also a third tunnel, the ramp from the northbound John Philip Sousa Bridge to westbound Southeast Boulevard SE.  Part of Southeast Freeway (Interstate 695). SE DC
(four) Chesapeake and Ohio Canal National Historical Park road culverts under the Canal:
 # 1 (mile 1.3), near Canal Road NW and Foxhall Road NW, NW DC
 # 2 (mile 3.1), Abner Cloud house (a.k.a. Fletcher's Boat House), Canal Road NW south of Arizona Avenue NW, NW DC
 (# 3 and # 4 are in Maryland)
Connecticut Avenue NW tunnel, twin tunnels, under Dupont Circle NW, NW DC
E Street Expressway NW tunnel under Virginia Avenue NW, NW DC
First Street Tunnel, twin (two tracks) rail tunnel, Amtrak south from Washington, under First Street NE and First SE on Capitol Hill, NE and SE DC
K Street NW tunnel, twin tunnels, under Washington Circle NW, NW DC
Massachusetts Avenue NW tunnel, twin tunnels, under Thomas Circle NW, NW DC
(two) Third Street Tunnels, Interstate 395
 southern portion, twin tunnels, under the National Mall Capitol reflecting pool, SW and NW DC
 northern portion, twin tunnels, under Massachusetts Ave NW and H Street NW, NW DC
Virginia Avenue Tunnel, rail tunnel, former Baltimore and Potomac Railroad tunnel now used by CSX RF&P Subdivision, under Virginia Avenue SE, SE DC
West Leg of Inner Loop (Interstate 66) tunnel under Juárez Circle NW (intersection of New Hampshire Avenue NW, Virginia Avenue NW, and 25th Street NW), NW DC
 Beach Drive tunnel

Florida

Henry E. Kinney Tunnel/New River Tunnel, twin tunnels, US 1 under New River in Fort Lauderdale
Port of Miami Tunnel, twin tunnels, State Road 886, beneath Biscayne Bay, connecting MacArthur Causeway on Watson Island with PortMiami on Dodge Island

Georgia
Brushy Mountain Tunnel (first named Divide Tunnel) on the Silver Comet Trail, which is the former Right-of-Way of Seaboard System rail line.  Brushy Mountain Road runs perpendicular and above the tunnel.  Located south of Braswell, Georgia and also about 6 miles east of Rockmart, Georgia.
(two) Chetoogeta Mountain Tunnels, rail tunnels just east of Tunnel Hill, Georgia
active CSX Transportation rail tunnel
abandoned Western & Atlantic Railroad rail tunnel, now a rail trail and historic site
Krog Street Tunnel, in Atlanta

Hawaii
Hospital Rock Tunnels, twin tunnels, Interstate H-3, Oahu; :Image:Koolau Range 03.JPG
John H. Wilson Tunnels, twin tunnels, State Route 63/Likelike Highway between Kaneohe and Honolulu, Oahu, goes under the Koʻolau Range
 (two) Nu‘uanu Pali Tunnels, each twin tunnels, State Route 61/Pali Highway between Kailua and Honolulu, Oahu; :Image:Pali Tunnels.jpg
Tetsuo Harano Tunnels, twin tunnels, Interstate H-3, Oahu; :Image:Koolau Range 03.JPG

Idaho
 St. Paul Pass Tunnel/Taft Tunnel, abandoned rail tunnel, in use 1908–1980, Chicago, Milwaukee, St. Paul & Pacific Railroad Tunnel Number 20, between Shoshone County, Idaho and Mineral County, Montana, now part of Milwaukee Road Rail Trail, el.

Illinois
Chicago Freight Subway,  rail tunnel system under the Chicago Loop, mostly abandoned
LaSalle Street Tunnel, streetcar tunnel, LaSalle Street under the Chicago River in Chicago, abandoned
Tunnel Hill State Trail tunnel, abandoned rail tunnel,  former Cairo and Vincennes Railroad tunnel now part of Tunnel Hill State Trail, used as a hiking and bike rail trail, between Tunnel Hill and Vienna in Johnson County
Van Buren Street Tunnel,  streetcar tunnel, Van Buren Street under the Chicago River in Chicago, abandoned
Washington Street Tunnel, streetcar tunnel, Washington Street under the Chicago River in Chicago, abandoned
East Dubuque rail tunnel, coming off Mississippi River Illinois Central RR Bridge in East Dubuque. Still in use. The 851 foot tunnel makes a 90° turn.

Indiana

Iowa

Kentucky
Cochran Hill Tunnel, twin tunnels, (I-64), carrying two lanes of traffic in each direction for I-64 under a section of Cherokee Park in Louisville between the exits at Grinstead Drive and Cannons Lane
Cumberland Gap Tunnel, twin tunnels, US 25E, under Cumberland Gap National Historical Park, between Middlesboro, Kentucky and Harrogate, Tennessee.
Nada Tunnel, KY 77, Powell County, near Red River Gorge Park, built for logging. 
Leatherwood Tunnel, twin tunnels, at Leatherwood in Perry County on KY 699.
Louisville East End Tunnel, I-265 (also KY 841), twin tunnels carrying two lanes of traffic in each direction for I-265 under a historic property between the Lewis and Clark Bridge and US 42 in Harrods Creek, a Louisville suburban neighborhood.

Louisiana
Belle Chasse Tunnel, LA 23 under the Gulf Intracoastal Waterway, southeast bound only, Belle Chasse (near New Orleans)
Harvey Tunnel, twin tunnels, Business U.S. 90 frontage roads, under the Gulf Intracoastal Waterway, Harvey (near New Orleans)
Houma Tunnel, (LA 3040) a two-lane tunnel crossing under the Gulf Intracoastal Waterway in Houma

Maryland

(three) Baltimore and Potomac Tunnels (B&P Tunnel), twin-track rail tunnels, Amtrak (formerly Pennsylvania Railroad), Baltimore
Gilmor Street Tunnel
Wilson Street Tunnel
John Street Tunnel
Baltimore Harbor Tunnel, twin tunnels, Interstate 895 under Patapsco River, Baltimore
Borden Tunnel, abandoned rail tunnel, 1911, 957 feet long, Western Maryland Railway north of Frostburg, now part of Great Allegheny Passage rail trail
Brush Tunnel, active tourist rail tunnel and rail trail, 1911, Western Maryland Scenic Railroad (formerly Western Maryland Railway), west of Corriganville, also now part of Great Allegheny Passage rail trail
Dalecarlia Tunnel, abandoned rail tunnel, 1910, CSX (formerly Baltimore and Ohio Railroad), underneath MacArthur Boulevard and the Washington Aqueduct in Brookmont, now part of Capital Crescent Trail rail trail
Fort McHenry Tunnel, quad tunnels, Interstate 95 under Baltimore Harbor, Baltimore
Henryton Tunnel, rail tunnel, c. 1850, CSX (formerly Baltimore and Ohio Railroad), west of Marriottsville
Howard Street Tunnel, rail tunnel, c.1895, CSX (formerly Baltimore and Ohio Railroad), Baltimore
Ilchester Tunnel, rail tunnel, c. 1903, CSX (formerly Baltimore and Ohio Railroad), east of Ellicott City
Jones Falls Conduit, water tunnel, built in 1914 to contain Jones Falls (river), from North Howard Street to East Baltimore Street, paralleling Jones Falls Expressway, in Baltimore
Paw Paw Tunnel, abandoned canal tunnel, in use 1850–1924, Chesapeake and Ohio Canal, Allegany County, Maryland, across the Potomac River from Paw Paw, West Virginia, now a rail trail; through same ridge as Kessler Tunnel (Western Maryland Railway) and Graham Tunnel (CSX) 
Union Tunnel, twin rail tunnels, Amtrak (formerly Pennsylvania Railroad), under Hoffman Street between Greenmount Avenue and Bond Street, Baltimore
(three) Western Maryland Railway tunnels, abandoned rail tunnels, in use 1906–1975, Western Maryland Railway ; from east to west:
Indigo Tunnel, abandoned rail tunnel, in use c. 1906–1975, northeast of Little Orleans 
Stickpile Tunnel, abandoned rail tunnel, in use 1906–1975, Green Ridge State Forest in Allegany County, between Little Orleans, Maryland and Paw Paw, West Virginia
Kessler Tunnel, abandoned rail tunnel, in use 1906–1975, Green Ridge State Forest in Allegany County, northeast of Paw Paw, West Virginia; through same ridge as Graham Tunnel (CSX) and Paw Paw Tunnel (Chesapeake and Ohio Canal)

Massachusetts
 Road tunnels connected to the Big Dig project in Boston:
 Callahan Tunnel/Sumner Tunnel, twin tunnels, State Route 1A, under Boston Harbor
 Callahan Tunnel, State Route 1A northeast-bound only, under Boston Harbor
 Sumner Tunnel, State Route 1A southwest-bound only, under Boston Harbor
 Fort Point Tunnel, twin tunnels, Massachusetts Turnpike/I-90 under Fort Point Channel, Boston
 Ted Williams Tunnel, twin tunnels, Massachusetts Turnpike/I-90 under Boston Harbor 
 Thomas P. O'Neill Jr. Tunnel, twin tunnels, 2003, I-93 (in coordination with the Dewey Square Tunnel), Boston
 Dewey Square Tunnel, southbound I-93, southbound portion of the Thomas P. O'Neill Jr. Tunnel, Boston
 Massachusetts Bay Transportation Authority tunnels in the Greater Boston area:
 MBTA Blue Line rail tunnel:
 East Boston Tunnel, rail tunnel, between Airport Station and Bowdoin, now part of the MBTA Blue Line
 MBTA Green Line rail tunnel:
 Tremont Street Subway, rail tunnel, between Science Park and Boylston, now part of the MBTA Green Line
 MBTA Orange Line rail tunnels, north to south:
 Haymarket North extension, partially tunneled rail line, between Community College and Haymarket, MBTA Orange Line
 Washington Street Tunnel, rail tunnel, between Haymarket and Chinatown, now the core of the MBTA Orange Line
 Southwest Corridor extension, partially tunneled rail line, between Chinatown and Mass Ave, MBTA Orange Line
 MBTA Red Line rail tunnels, north to south:
 Cambridge tunnel, rail tunnel, between Alewife and Longfellow Bridge, now part of the MBTA Red Line
 Dorchester Tunnel, rail tunnel, between Longfellow Bridge and JFK/UMass, now part of the MBTA Red Line
 MBTA road tunnels, north to south:
 Harvard Bus Tunnel, connects Harvard MBTA station under Harvard Square in Cambridge
 MBTA Silver Line, bus tunnel, between South Station and Silver Line Way under Fort Point Channel
 Hoosac Tunnel, rail tunnel, 1875, 4.75 miles (7.64 km) long, Pan Am Railways (formerly Boston and Maine Railroad), through the Berkshire Mountains between North Adams and Florida, Massachusetts
 The longest active transportation tunnel in North America east of the Rocky Mountains
 Prudential Center Complex tunnel, twin road tunnels and one rail tunnel, Massachusetts Turnpike/I-90 under Prudential Center Complex, Boston

Michigan
Detroit-Windsor Tunnel, road tunnel, Detroit to Windsor, Ontario, Canada under the Detroit River
Michigan Central Railway Tunnel, twin rail tunnels, Canadian Pacific Railway (formerly Michigan Central Railway), Detroit to Windsor, Ontario, Canada under the Detroit River
(two) St. Clair Tunnels, rail tunnels, Port Huron to Sarnia, Ontario, Canada under the St. Clair River
original tunnel, 1891, abandoned and sealed c. 1994
current tunnel, c.1994, Canadian National Railway
South Washington Avenue Tunnel, twin road tunnels, in Holland, under runway 8/26 at West Michigan Regional Airport

Minnesota

Eastman tunnel, defunct water tunnel; the tunnel ran downstream from Nicollet Island, beneath Hennepin Island, and exited below St. Anthony Falls; Minneapolis 
 Ely's Peak Tunnel, abandoned rail tunnel, in use c. 1912–1984, Duluth, Winnipeg and Pacific Railway, Short Line Park southwest of Duluth, now a rail trail
(four) Interstate 35 tunnels, short twin tunnels, between downtown Duluth and its end near London Road
Lowry Hill Tunnel, twin tunnels, Interstate 94, near downtown Minneapolis
 Portland Tunnel, single 3-lane tunnel carrying eastbound traffic, Interstate 94 near downtown Minneapolis
METRO Blue Line airport tunnels,  twin bore light rail tunnels,  under Runways 12L/30R and 12R/30L at Minneapolis–Saint Paul International Airport; Terminal 1–Lindbergh station is midway through the tunnel
Selby Ave Trolley tunnel, two-track, abandoned and sealed, streetcar tunnel, former Twin City Rapid Transit under Selby Avenue and Shelby Hill, Saint Paul
Silver Creek Cliff Tunnel, two-lane road tunnel, Highway 61, northeast of Two Harbors 
Lafayette Bluff Tunnel, two-lane road tunnel, Highway 61, southwest of Castle Danger

Missouri
Lindbergh Boulevard Tunnel, twin tunnels, 2006, US Route 67/Lindbergh Boulevard under runway 11/29 at St. Louis-Lambert International Airport in Bridgeton, St. Louis County
(four) Rock Island Railroad Tunnels, abandoned rail tunnels, in use 1903/4-1980, Chicago, Rock Island & Pacific Railroad; being developed into a rail trail; from east to west:
Freeburg Tunnel/Rock Island Tunnel # 1, abandoned rail tunnel, in use 1903–1980, Chicago, Rock Island & Pacific Railroad, under US 63 in Freeburg in Osage County; being developed into a rail trail
Koesltown Tunnel/Argyle Tunnel/Rock Island Tunnel # 2, abandoned rail tunnel, in use 1903–1980, Chicago, Rock Island & Pacific Railroad, under Osage Country Road 541 west of Koeltztown in Osage County; being developed into a rail trail
Eugene Tunnel/Rock Island Tunnel # 3, abandoned rail tunnel, in use 1903–1980, Chicago, Rock Island & Pacific Railroad, under State Route 17 just south of Eugene; being developed into a rail trail
Vale Tunnel/Rock Island Tunnel # 4, abandoned rail tunnel, in use 1904–1980, Chicago, Rock Island & Pacific Railroad, under Bannister Road southeast of Raytown, Jackson County; developed into a rail trail

Montana

Nebraska
Belmont Tunnel; abandoned rail tunnel, currently a road tunnel; in use as a rail tunnel 1889–1992, bypassed 1992; Chicago, Burlington and Quincy Railroad (later BNSF Railway); in Dawes County between Marsland and Crawford; currently a BNSF service road
(four) Scotts Bluff National Monument tunnels, Scotts Bluff National Monument west of Gering in Scotts Bluff County
(three) road tunnels on Summit Road, the road to the top of Scotts Bluff National Monument
trail tunnel on Saddle Rock Trail, the hiking trail to the top of Scotts Bluff National Monument

Nevada
Airport Tunnel (Las Vegas), tri tunnels (two road tunnels and one future transit tunnel), under runways 7L/25R and 7R/25L and several taxiways at Las Vegas McCarran International Airport, connecting the Airport Spur Connector (unsigned SR 171) to Paradise Road in Paradise 
Carlin Tunnels, twin rail tunnels and twin road tunnels, between Carlin and Elko
Carlin Rail Tunnels, twin rail tunnels, 1903, Union Pacific Railroad (formerly Central Pacific Railroad and Western Pacific Railroad)
Carlin Road Tunnel, twin road tunnels, 1975, I-80, Mile Marker 285, 0.27 miles long

New Jersey

Atlantic City-Brigantine Connector Tunnel, twin road tunnels, joins Atlantic City Expressway and the Marina District, Atlantic City
Bergen Arches, Erie Railroad (abandoned), beneath Bergen Hill or lower New Jersey Palisades, Jersey City. Open cut with short tunnels.
Central Jersey Expressway (NJ 29) tunnel, Trenton
Edgewater Tunnel New York, Susquehanna and Western Railroad (abandoned), from Fairview to Edgewater
Holland Tunnel, beneath Hudson River between Jersey City and Manhattan
Downtown Hudson Tubes and Uptown Hudson Tubes, Port Authority Trans-Hudson rail system beneath Hudson River between Jersey City and Manhattan
Lincoln Tunnel, beneath Hudson River between Weehawken and Manhattan
Long Dock Tunnel, former Erie Railroad, CSX and Norfolk Southern Railway beneath Bergen Hill or lower New Jersey Palisades, Jersey City
Musconetcong Tunnel, Lehigh Valley Railroad, West Portal to Pattenburg, Hunterdon County 
Newark City Subway, New Jersey Transit, Newark
North River Tunnels, former Pennsylvania Railroad (now Amtrak and New Jersey Transit), beneath Hudson River between Weehawken and Manhattan
Oxford Tunnel, Delaware, Lackawanna and Western Railroad (abandoned), Oxford 
Roseville Tunnel, Delaware, Lackawanna and Western Railroad, near Andover on the Lackawanna Cut-off (abandoned but slated for restored service) 
Route 18 Tunnel (northbound only) in New Brunswick
Vass Gap Tunnel, Delaware, Lackawanna and Western Railroad (abandoned), Manunka Chunk
Weehawken Tunnel, former West Shore Railroad, Weehawken. Now used for Hudson-Bergen Light Rail.

New Mexico
Raton Tunnel, rail tunnel, BNSF (formerly Atchison, Topeka and Santa Fe Railway), under Raton Pass between Raton, New Mexico and Trinidad, Colorado
(two) Cumbres and Toltec Scenic Railroad tunnels, narrow-gauge rail tunnels, Cumbres and Toltec Scenic Railroad (formerly Denver and Rio Grande Railway), in Rio Arriba County, New Mexico between Antonito, Colorado and Chama, New Mexico, east of Cumbres Pass; from east to west:
Cloudcroft Tunnel, Mexican Canyon, US 82, Otero County between Alamogordo and Cloudcroft

New York

New York City Subway tunnels:
 Fort George Tunnel, IRT Broadway–Seventh Avenue Line, 2 miles of rock tunnel from 157th Street to Dyckman Street, the second-longest two-track tunnel in the country (after the Hoosac Tunnel) when completed in 1906.
14th Street Tunnel, BMT Canarsie Line under East River between Manhattan and Brooklyn
53rd Street Tunnel, IND Queens Boulevard Line under East River between Manhattan and Queens
60th Street Tunnel, BMT Broadway Line under East River between Manhattan and Queens
63rd Street Tunnel, IND 63rd Street Line under East River between Manhattan and Queens
149th Street Tunnel, IRT Lenox Avenue Line under Harlem River between Manhattan and The Bronx
Clark Street Tunnel, IRT Broadway–Seventh Avenue Line under East River between Lower Manhattan and Brooklyn
Concourse Tunnel, IND Concourse Line under Harlem River between Manhattan and The Bronx
Cranberry Street Tunnel, IND Eighth Avenue Line under East River between Lower Manhattan and Brooklyn
Joralemon Street Tunnel, IRT Lexington Avenue Line under East River between Lower Manhattan and Brooklyn
Montague Street Tunnel, BMT Broadway Line, BMT Nassau Street Line under East River between Lower Manhattan and Brooklyn
Rutgers Street Tunnel, IND Sixth Avenue Line under East River between Lower Manhattan and Brooklyn
Steinway Tunnel, IRT Flushing Line under East River between Manhattan and Queens

Other tunnels in New York City:

Atlantic Avenue tunnels on Long Island Rail Road:
Abandoned Cobble Hill Tunnel under Atlantic Avenue, Downtown Brooklyn
Current Atlantic Branch tunnels under Atlantic Avenue, Downtown Brooklyn and Queens
Brooklyn-Battery Tunnel, I-478 under East River/New York Bay between Lower Manhattan and Brooklyn
East River Tunnels, Amtrak/Long Island Rail Road/Metro-North Railroad under East River between Midtown Manhattan and Queens
First Avenue Tunnel, First Avenue, Midtown Manhattan
Holland Tunnel, I-78 under Hudson River between Jersey City and Lower Manhattan
Hudson Tubes:
Uptown Hudson Tubes of the Port Authority Trans-Hudson (PATH) under Hudson River between Hoboken and Midtown Manhattan
Downtown Hudson Tubes of the Port Authority Trans-Hudson (PATH) under Hudson River between Jersey City and Lower Manhattan
Lincoln Tunnel, New Jersey Route 495 under Hudson River between Weehawken and Midtown Manhattan
Park Avenue (Murray Hill) Tunnel, Park Avenue in Murray Hill, Manhattan
North River Tunnels, Pennsylvania Railroad (now Amtrak and New Jersey Transit) under Hudson River between Weehawken and Midtown Manhattan
Park Avenue Railroad Tunnel, Metro-North Railroad, Upper East Side, Manhattan
Queens–Midtown Tunnel, I-495 under East River between Midtown Manhattan and Queens
Riverside Park Tunnel, Amtrak/Metro-North Railroad, Manhattan

Other tunnels in New York State:
New York City water supply system tunnels 1 and 2
New York City Water Tunnel No. 3
Otisville Tunnel on Erie Railroad, Otisville, Orange County
Shandaken Tunnel, New York City water supply system, between Schoharie Reservoir and Esopus Creek
 State Line Tunnel, Canaan, on the Boston and Albany main rail line.

North Carolina
Beaucatcher Tunnel, 1929, US 70/Tunnel Road through Beaucatcher Mountain, just east of downtown Asheville, 
Cowee Tunnel, rail tunnel, Great Smoky Mountains Railroad (formerly Murphy Branch, Western North Carolina Railroad), just northwest of Dillsboro in Jackson County
Jarrett's Tunnel, McDowell County, 
I-40 tunnels, 1 westbound, 2 eastbound, near mile marker 6, opened 1968.
Blue Ridge Parkway tunnels from the 1930s, numbering 25

North Dakota
Cartwright Tunnel, located in McKenzie County, is the first and only railroad tunnel in North Dakota. It was built in 1913 but a train never traveled through it.

Ohio
Lytle Tunnel, tri freeway tunnels, I-71 under Lytle Park, downtown Cincinnati, ; the tri tunnels are side by side, from west to east:
a two-lane I-71 southbound tunnel
a one lane southbound tunnel for the I-71 exit ramp to Downtown/Riverfront/Third Street
a three-lane I-71 northbound tunnel

Oklahoma
Jenson Tunnel, located in LeFlore County (just southwest of Bonanza, Arkansas), is the first and only railroad tunnel in Oklahoma. It was built through Backbone Mountain during the mid 1880s in Indian Territory by the Fort Smith & Southern Railway. It is still in operation today, primarily used by the Kansas City Southern Railway.

Oregon

Many unnamed, numbered railroad tunnels exist within Oregon.

Pennsylvania

Puerto Rico
Minillas Tunnel, twin tunnels, Puerto Rico Highway 22, Santurce, San Juan
Tren Urbano, automated subway section between Universidad and Río Piedras.
Túnel Vicente Morales Lebrón, Puerto Rico Highway 53, Emajagua, Maunabo

Rhode Island
East Side Railroad Tunnel, abandoned and sealed rail tunnel, between Gano Street and Benefit Street under College Hill, in Providence
East Side Trolley Tunnel, transit bus tunnel (converted from trolley use), 1914, between North Mail Street and Thayer Street under College Hill, in Providence

South Carolina
Stumphouse Mountain Tunnel, never completed rail tunnel, Blue Ridge and Atlantic Railroad, northwest of Walhalla

Tennessee
Cowan Tunnel/Cumberland Mountain Tunnel, rail tunnel, 1853, CSX Railroad (originally Nashville and Chattanooga Railroad), east of Cowan
Cumberland Gap Tunnel, twin tunnels, US 25E, under Cumberland Gap National Historical Park, between Harrogate, Tennessee and Middlesboro, Kentucky
U.S. Highway 441 Tunnel Northbound, between Gatlinburg and Pigeon Forge and 2 more tunnels in Great Smoky Mountains National Park on Highway 441 between Gatlinburg and Cherokee
Bachmann Tubes, which carry Ringgold Road through Missionary Ridge from Chattanooga into the neighboring town of East Ridge.
Missionary Ridge Tunnels (also unofficially known as McCallie Tunnels), which carry McCallie and Bailey Avenues through Missionary Ridge where the route continues as Brainerd Road.
Wilcox Tunnel, which carries Wilcox Boulevard through Missionary Ridge and connects to Shallowford Road.
Whiteside Tunnel (Missionary Ridge Railroad Tunnel) carries the Tennessee Valley Railroad Museum trains between East Chattanooga and Grand Junction.  Construction of the tunnel was started by the Chattanooga, Harrison, Georgetown and Charleston Railroad which went bankrupt before the work was completed. The tunnel was completed by the East Tennessee and Georgia Railroad as part of their Chattanooga Branch. The railroad named the tunnel after Col. James A. Whiteside-a well known Chattanoogan and major stockholder of the East Tennessee and Georgia Railroad.

Texas
Addison Airport Toll Tunnel, Keller Springs Road under Addison Airport, Addison
DART tunnel, twin light-rail tunnels, 3.5 miles long, between Pearl/Arts District Station and Mockingbird Station, Dallas
Dallas Pedestrian Network, pedestrian tunnels, downtown Dallas
Dead Mans Curve, tunnel, Park Route 12, Big Bend National Park
East R.L. Thornton Freeway (Interstate 30), four tunnels under Hotel Street and four railroad lines between Stemmons Freeway (I-35E) and Botham Jean Boulevard in downtown Dallas 
(two) Houston Ship Channel tunnels, road tunnels; from east to west:
Baytown Tunnel, abandoned road tunnel, between Baytown and La Porte, demolished by 1998
Washburn Tunnel, under Houston Ship Channel/Buffalo Bayou, between Galena Park and Pasadena, east of Houston
Houston tunnel system, pedestrian tunnels, downtown Houston
Judge Alfred Hernandez Tunnel, Main Street between Naylor and Burnett Streets north of downtown Houston
Memorial Drive, new wildlife tunnels thru Memorial Park in Houston (opened in March 2022) 
Navigation Boulevard, under Commerce Street and four railroad lines east of downtown Houston 
Santa Fe Terminal Complex, abandoned rail tunnels, downtown Dallas 
South R.L. Thornton Freeway (Interstate 35E), cut-and-cover tunnel between Ewing and Marsalis Avenues in the Oak Cliff neighborhood southwest of downtown Dallas; Southern Gateway Deck Park (currently under construction) will cover the freeway
Spring Valley Road, under Central Expressway (US 75) in Richardson
Tandy Center Subway, abandoned light rail tunnel, operated 1963–2002, Fort Worth
Woodall Rodgers Freeway (Spur 366), cut-and-cover tunnel between Saint Paul and Pearl Streets in downtown Dallas (Klyde Warren Park covers the freeway)

Utah

Red Canyon Tunnel on SR-12
Twin tunnel on US 189 in Provo Canyon

Vermont
two New England Central Railroad tunnels, rail tunnels; from south to north:
Bellows Falls Tunnel, 1851, formerly Vermont Valley Railroad, Bellows Falls
Burlington Tunnel, 1861, formerly Central Vermont Railway, Burlington
Middlebury Tunnel, proposed rail tunnel under Main Street and Merchants Row, Vermont Railway, Middlebury

Virginia 

Bee Rock Tunnel, Appalachia
Big Walker Mountain Tunnel, Interstate 77 south of Bland
Blue Ridge Tunnel -  - Chesapeake and Ohio Railway (now Buckingham Branch Railroad), Rockfish Gap
Brookville Tunnel -  - Chesapeake and Ohio Railway near Greenwood, demolished
Chesapeake Bay Bridge-Tunnel, US 13 beneath Chesapeake Bay between Virginia Beach and Northampton County
Church Hill Tunnel -  - Chesapeake and Ohio Railway, Richmond, abandoned
Colonial Parkway tunnel beneath Colonial Williamsburg historic district, Williamsburg
Downtown Tunnel, Interstate 264 beneath Elizabeth River between Portsmouth and Norfolk
East River Mountain Tunnel, twin tunnels, I-77, between Bland County, Virginia and Mercer County, West Virginia
Greenwood Tunnel -  - Chesapeake and Ohio Railway near Greenwood, abandoned
Hampton Roads Bridge-Tunnel, Interstate 64 beneath Hampton Roads between Hampton and Norfolk
Marys Rock Tunnel, 1932, mile marker 32.2 on Skyline Drive, Shenandoah National Park, south of US 211
Midtown Tunnel, US 58 beneath Elizabeth River between Portsmouth and Norfolk
Monitor-Merrimac Memorial Bridge-Tunnel, Interstate 664 beneath Hampton Roads between Newport News and Suffolk
Natural Tunnel, Norfolk Southern Railway near Duffield, actually a naturally formed cave used as a railroad tunnel
Pedestrian tunnel beneath Shirley Highway (I-395) between Army Navy Drive and Pentagon south parking lot, Arlington

Washington

Beacon Hill tunnel, Link light rail, Seattle
Cascade Tunnel, BNSF Railway, near Stevens Pass
Downtown Seattle Transit Tunnel, Link light rail (and formerly buses), Downtown Seattle
Great Northern Tunnel, BNSF Railway, Seattle
State Route 99 Tunnel, Washington State Route 99, Downtown Seattle
Mount Baker Tunnel, twin tunnels, Interstate 90 and Link light rail, Seattle
Northgate Link tunnel, Link light rail, Seattle
Snoqualmie Tunnel, formerly Chicago, Milwaukee, St. Paul and Pacific Railroad, now rail-trail, near Snoqualmie Pass
Stampede Tunnel, BNSF Railway, near Easton
University Link tunnel, Link light rail, Seattle

West Virginia

(two) Big Bend Tunnels, rail tunnels, CSX (formerly Chesapeake and Ohio Railway), just west of Talcott
Great Bend Tunnel, abandoned rail tunnel, in use 1873–1974, Chesapeake and Ohio Railway
Big Bend Tunnel, active rail tunnel, 1932, 
Board Tree Tunnel, abandoned rail tunnel, 1858, Baltimore and Ohio Railroad, north of Littleton
(four) Magnolia Cutoff Tunnels, twin-track rail tunnel, 1914, CSX (formerly Baltimore and Ohio Railroad), northeast of Paw Paw, one in Maryland; from northeast to southwest:
Randolph Tunnel, northeast of Hansrote
Stuart Tunnel, between Hansrote and Magnolia
(Graham Tunnel, Allegany County, Maryland; northeast of Paw Paw, West Virginia)
Carothers Tunnel, just northeast of Paw Paw
East River Mountain Tunnel, twin tunnels, I-77, between Mercer County, West Virginia and Bland County, Virginia
(two) Kingwood Tunnels, rail tunnels, Baltimore and Ohio Railroad, just west of Tunnelton 
abandoned rail tunnel, 1858, abandoned and sealed 1962
active rail tunnel, twin tracks, 1912
Memorial Tunnel, abandoned and bypassed 2-lane road tunnel, formerly West Virginia Turnpike/I-77
Tunnel No. 1, Baltimore and Ohio Railroad, Wheeling
Wheeling Tunnel, twin tunnels, I-70, Wheeling

Wisconsin
Mitchell Interchange (three tunnels) in Milwaukee 
Interstate 43 (northbound only) with first tunnel under Interstate 41 and second tunnel under Interstate 94
Interstate 41 (northbound only) transition road under Interstate 94
South Howell Avenue (Wisconsin Highway 38) beneath Runway 7R at Milwaukee Mitchell International Airport in Milwaukee

Wyoming
Green River Tunnel, twin tunnels,  (0.22 miles) long, I-80, Green River Mile Marker 89

There is also a tunnel on Rt 14 west of Cody, Wyoming right by the Cody Reservoir dam. It is around 3,600 feet long.

References

Tunnels